Wolanów may refer to the following places in Poland:
Wolanów, Lower Silesian Voivodeship (south-west Poland)
Wolanów, Masovian Voivodeship (east-central Poland)